Middle Marsyandgi Hydropower Station (Nepali:मध्य मर्स्याङ्दी जलविद्युत आयोजना) is a run-of-river hydro-electric plant located in  Lamjung district of western Nepal. The flow from Marshyangdi River is used to generate 70 MW electricity.  The plant is connected to the national grid of Nepal. 

The plant was set to be commissioned in 2004 but it was delayed by four years.  The plant faces siltation problems from time to time.

See also
Marsyangdi Hydropower Station (another 69 MW station in the same river)
List of power stations in Nepal

References

Hydroelectric power stations in Nepal
Gravity dams
Run-of-the-river power stations
Dams in Nepal
Buildings and structures in Lamjung District